Neurogenic claudication (NC), also known as pseudoclaudication, is the most common symptom of lumbar spinal stenosis (LSS) and describes intermittent leg pain from impingement of the nerves emanating from the spinal cord. Neurogenic means that the problem originates within the nervous system. Claudication, from the Latin word for to limp, refers to painful cramping or weakness in the legs.  should therefore be distinguished from vascular claudication, which stems from a circulatory problem rather than a neural one.

The term neurogenic claudication is sometimes used interchangeably with spinal stenosis. However, the former is a clinical term, while the latter more specifically describes the condition of spinal narrowing.  is a medical condition most commonly caused by damage and compression to the lower spinal nerve roots. It is a neurological and orthopedic condition that affects the motor nervous system of the body, specifically, the lower back, legs, hips and glutes.  does not occur by itself, but rather, is associated with other underlying spinal or neurological conditions such as spinal stenosis or abnormalities and degenerative changes in the spine. The International Association for the Study of Pain defines neurogenic claudication as, "pain from intermittent compression and/or ischemia of a single or multiple nerve roots within an intervertebral foramen or the central spinal canal.

The predominant symptoms of  involve one or both legs and usually presents as some combination of tingling, cramping discomfort, pain, numbness, or weakness in the lower back, calves, glutes, and/or thighs and is precipitated by walking and prolonged standing. However, the symptoms vary depending on the severity and cause of the condition. Lighter symptoms include pain or heaviness in the legs, hips, glutes and lower back, post-exercise. Mild to severe symptoms include prolonged constant pain, tiredness and discomfort in the lower half of the body. In severe cases, impaired motor function and ability in the lower body can be observed, and bowel or bladder dysfunction may be present. Therefore, patients with  have less disability in climbing steps, pushing carts, and cycling.

Treatment options for  depends on the severity and cause of the condition, and may be nonsurgical or surgical. Nonsurgical interventions include drugs, physical therapy, and spinal injections. Spinal decompression is the main surgical intervention and is the most common back surgery in patients over 65. Other forms of surgical procedures include: laminectomy, microdiscectomy and laminoplasty. Patients with minor symptoms are usually advised to undergo physical therapy, such as stretching and strengthening exercises. In patients with more severe symptoms, medications such as pain relievers and steroids are prescribed in conjunction with physical therapy. Surgical treatments are predominantly used to relieve pressure on the spinal nerve roots and are used when nonsurgical interventions are ineffective or show no effective progress.

Diagnosis of neurogenic claudication is based on typical clinical features, the physical exam, and findings of spinal stenosis on Computer Tomography (CT) or X-Ray imaging. In addition to vascular claudication, diseases affecting the spine and musculoskeletal system should be considered in the differential diagnosis.

Signs and Symptoms 
Neurogenic claudication commonly describes pain, weakness, fatigue, tingling, heaviness and/or paresthesias that extend into the lower extremities. These symptoms may involve only one leg, but they usually involve both. Leg pain is usually more significant than back pain in individuals who have both.  is classically distinguished by symptoms improving or worsening with certain activities and manoeuvres. Pain may occur with walking, standing, and/or back extension. Sitting and bending or leaning forward tend to provide relief. Patients may also report that pain is worse while walking down stairs and improved while walking up stairs or using a bicycle or shopping cart. A positive "shopping cart sign" refers to the worsening of pain with spinal extension and improvement with spinal flexion.

In extreme cases of  constant discomfort, pain or numbness is experienced. This results in patients to have decreased mobility and function as excessive or constant movements cause pain. Exercise and prolonged walking often become difficult and are triggers of pain, tiredness, numbness and heaviness in the legs, lower back and hips. Common tasks such as standing upright for an extended duration or picking up heavy objects may become increasingly difficult to perform. In addition, patients with severe  may experience difficulties sleeping as lying down on their back causes discomfort and pain. In very extreme cases, bowel or bladder dysfunction can occur. However, this is a consequence of the underlying cause of  rather than the condition itself. As most causes of  involve increased pressure or damage to the nerves in the lower spine, damage and pressure on the nerves that extend to the bowel or bladder may occur, leading to bowel or bladder dysfunction.

On physical examination, patients with  have normal peripheral pulses. The neurologic exam, straight leg raise, and femoral nerve stretch are typically normal. Abnormal signs may be revealed if the patient is observed walking until they exhibit . For example, a positive "stoop test" is observed if bending forward or stooping while walking relieves symptoms. Occasionally, patients may have other signs such as sensory loss or gait changes.

Causes 
These changes, such as bulging disks, thickening of ligaments and overgrowth of bone spurs, lead to pressure and potentially damage to the spinal nerve roots. Other secondary causes include space-occupying lesions, ankylosing spondylitis, rheumatoid arthritis, and Paget's disease. Less commonly, the cause of spinal stenosis may be present at birth as seen in achondroplasia, spina bifida, and certain mucopolysaccharidoses. In addition to spinal stenosis, other lower back conditions such as spondylosis, tumors, infections and herniated or ruptured discs can cause . These conditions contribute to the potential narrowing of the spinal cord, increasing pressure and inducing damage on the spinal nerve roots, thus, causing paing, tingling or weakness in the lower body.

Risk factors for  include:

 Age
 Degenerative changes of the spine
 Obesity
 Family history of spinal stenosis
 Tobacco use
 Occupation involving repetitive mechanical stress on the spine
Past deformities or injuries to the spine

Diagnosis and Evaluation 

Neurogenic claudication is one subtype of the clinical syndrome of lumbar spinal stenosis (LSS). No gold standard diagnostic criteria currently exist, but evaluation and diagnosis is generally based on the patient history, physical exam, and medical imaging. The accuracy of a diagnosis of  increases with each additional suggestive clinical finding. Therefore, a combination of signs and symptoms may be more helpful in diagnosing NC than any single feature of the history or physical exam. These signs and symptoms include pain triggered by standing, pain relieved by sitting, symptoms above the knees, and a positive "shopping cart sign".

Specific questions that may aid diagnosis include:

 "Does the patient have leg or buttock pain while walking?"
 "Does the patient flex forward to relieve symptoms?"
 "Does patient feel relief when using a shopping cart or bicycle?"
 "Does the patient have motor or sensory disturbance while walking?"
 "Are the pulses in the foot present and symmetric?"
 "Does the patient have lower extremity weakness?"
 "Does the patient have low back pain?"
The physical exam may include observation, evaluation of pulses in the foot, lumbar spine range of motion, and components of a neurological exam.

Helpful imaging may include x-rays, CT, CT myelogram, and magnetic resonance imaging (MRI), but MRI is preferred. Abnormal MRI findings may be present in two-thirds of asymptomatic individuals, and imaging findings of spinal stenosis do not correlate well with symptom severity. Therefore, imaging findings must be considered in the context of a patient's history and physical exam when seeking a diagnosis. The evidence for using objective imaging findings to define  has been conflicting.

Differential diagnosis 
Neurogenic claudication must be differentiated from other causes of leg pain, which may be present in a number of conditions involving the spine and musculoskeletal system. The differential diagnosis for  includes:

 Vascular claudication
 Lumbosacral radicular pain secondary to lumbar disc herniation
 Referred pain from spinal structures, hip or sacroiliac joint, myofascia, or viscera
 Trochanteric bursitis
 Piriformis syndrome
 Muscle pain
 Vertebral compression fracture
 Compartment syndrome
 Peripheral neuropathy

Neurogenic vs vascular claudication 

Both neurogenic claudication and vascular claudication manifest as leg pain with walking, but several key features help distinguish between these conditions. The walking distance necessary to produce pain in vascular claudication is more consistent than in neurogenic claudication.

Pathophysiology 

Degenerative disc disease (DDD) may trigger the pathogenesis of neurogenic claudication. This results in spinal instability and more degenerative changes in spinal structures including facet joints, ligamentum flavum, and intervertebral discs. These pathologic changes result in narrowing of the vertebral canal and neurovascular compression at the lumbosacral nerve roots. The compression of these spinal nerve roots that control sensation and movement in the lower body results in the tingling, pain and weakness  patients often experience. However, because the severity of symptoms does not correlate well with the degree of stenosis and nerve root compression, a clear understanding of the specific pathogenesis remains challenging.

The two main proposed mechanisms agree that neurovascular compression plays a role. In contrast, the venous stasis theory proposes that a combination of low oxygen levels and metabolite buildup are responsible due to venous backup at the cauda equina. Pain with walking may be partially explained by the corresponding increase in nerve root oxygen requirements.

These changes in blood flow may occur during back extension when shifts in vertebral structures and ligaments narrow the spinal canal and compress the neurovasculature. Compared to a neutral position, extended spines exhibit 15% less cross-sectional area of the intervertebral foramina, and nerve root compression is present one-third of the time. These dynamic changes in the shape of the spinal canal are more pronounced in individuals with spinal stenosis. The amount of narrowing may be 67% in  compared to 9% in healthy spines.

Treatment 

Treatment options for  aim to cure the underlying cause of the condition, such as lumbar spinal stenosis (LSS) or other degenerative spinal diseases. Constant discomfort and pain in the lower extremities and an inability to sleep lying down are also disabling features of  that affect a patient's quality of life. Therefore, the target of most treatments is to solve these complications. Currently, several treatment options are available to patients, and they can be grouped broadly into nonsurgical and surgical options. Nonsurgical treatments include medications, physical therapy, and spinal injections. Medication options for neurogenic claudication have included non-steroidal anti-inflammatory drugs (NSAIDs), prostaglandin-based drugs, gabapentin, and methylcobalamin. However, the quality of evidence supporting their use is not high enough for specific recommendations. Physical therapy is commonly prescribed to patients, but the quality of evidence supporting its use for neurogenic claudication is also low. Preparations may contain lidocaine and/or steroids. They may be considered for short-term pain relief or to delay surgery, but their benefit is considered small.

Physical Therapy 

Patients that experience light to mild symptoms are commonly treated through physical therapy, which involves stretching and strengthening the lower back, abdominal (core) and leg muscles. Common stretches used include the knee to chest stretch, posterior pelvic tilt, neural stretching of the legs, hip-flexor stretch and lower trunk rotation. In conjunction with these stretches, various strengthening exercises are often implemented, targeting the core, lower back and hip muscles. Common exercises include bridges, bird to dog, tabletop leg press, clamshell and knees to chest. Depending on the age, mobility and physical health of patients, a combination of easier and more difficult exercises should be prescribed to suit the patient's needs. More difficult exercises may include the incorporation of resistance training (weights), gym equipment and more explosive movements. Other exercises such as cycling (stationary), swimming and water-based activities have also been found to strengthen and improve overall stability and strength in the core, lower back and hips. Ultimately, the aim of physical therapy is to loosen and relax the tight muscles and ligaments that contribute to the symptoms, and to strengthen those muscles to prevent further reocurrences of the condition. However, studies have found conflicting conclusions in regards to the effectiveness of physical therapy as a treatment option for  patients.

Stretching Exercises 
Common stretching exercises used to relieve pain and treat  include:

 Knee to chest stretch - Lying down on the back, bring one leg up and pull it towards the chest and hold for 30–45 seconds.
 Posterior pelvic tilt (bridges) - Lying on the back, bend both legs and place your feet on the floor. Raise stomach from the ground, lifting the back and pelvis, until the back is straight. Hold for 5–10 seconds and relax. 
 Neural Stretching of the legs - Lying on the back, bring one leg up with a stretching band until a stretch is felt in the legs. Ensure your legs are straight. Once the stretch is felt, hold for 30–45 seconds and relax.
 Hip-flexor stretch - To stretch the right hip-flexor, bring the left leg forward, and kneel on the right knee. Push the pelvis forward (lean forward), whilst keeping the upper body straight. Hold the position for 30–45 seconds and relax. To stretch the left hip-flexor, bring swap the positions of the legs. 
 Lower trunk rotation - Lying down on the back, bring both knees towards your chest whilst keeping the back flat on the floor. Rotate the bent legs from the left to right side and vice versa whilst keeping back flat on the ground.

Strengthening Exercises 
Common strengthening exercises used to treat and prevent future reocurrences of  include:

 Posterior pelvic tilt (bridges) - Lying on the back, bend both legs and place your feet on the floor. Raise stomach from the ground, lifting the back and pelvis, until the back is straight. Hold for 5–10 seconds and relax.
 Quadruped opposite arm/leg (bird to dog) - On all fours (knees on ground and arms against floor supporting upper body) straighten one knee whilst straightening the opposite side arm and hold for 3 seconds and repeat for the other arm/leg pair. 
 Tabletop leg press press - Lying on the back, bring both knees towards the chest and then straighten both legs (such that legs are hanging in the air), whilst keeping the back flat on the ground. 
 Clamshell - Whilst lying on the side with knees bent inwards, bring the top knee up (whilst keeping leg bent) and hold for 3 seconds. To exercise the opposite leg, lie on the opposite side and repeat. 
 Abdominal draw-in (knee to chest) - Lying flat on the back, bend both legs and bring knees towards the chest without lifting the back from the ground and then straighten legs again. For a more difficult version of the exercise, keep one leg bent and feet on the ground and bring the other leg towards the chest.

Medications 

The main goal of these medications is to reduce pain and provide temporary relief for  patients. NSAIDs and prostaglandin-based medications control inflammation at sites of nerve damage or pressure by inhibiting cyclooxygenase activity, and reducing the production of prostaglandins, a key contributor of inflammation. By reducing inflammation, less pressure is put on the nerve roots, decreasing pain, and providing relief for  patients. Gabapentin aims to reduce pain and provide relief by altering the normal functioning of neurotransmitters that induce a sensation of pain and discomfort. However, the exact mechanism of Gabapentin’s functioning in the body is not completely understood and current knowledge is based on experimental studies that target the nervous system.  Methylcobalamin is another medication that targets the nervous system to reduce pain and provide  patients with temporary pain-relief. Epidural steroid injections are the main epidural injections prescribed to treat . Whilst the use of medications is common among  patients that experience frequent or constant pain, their effectiveness has yielded mixed results in studies.

Surgical Interventions 

Depending on the cause and severity of the condition, surgical options for  vary. Surgery is generally reserved for patients whose symptoms do not improve with nonsurgical treatments, and the main objective of surgery is to relieve pressure on the spinal nerve roots and recover normal mobility and quality of life. Lower Spinal Decompression is considered the mainstay of surgical treatment. In this procedure, the ligamentum flavum is first removed, followed by the removal of the superior facet osteophyte in the spinal canal, and then the decompression of the spinal nerve root. Another surgical method of decompression is the Fenestration method, which involves creating a small window in the spinal canal and then decompressing the nerves. Alternative surgical options include the use of interspinous process spacers, minimally invasive lumbar decompression (MILD) procedure, laminectomy, microdiscectomy and placement of a spinal cord stimulator. The MILD procedure aims to relieve spinal cord compression by percutaneous removal of portions of the ligamentum flavum and lamina. Laminectomy also involves partial or complete removal and sacrifice of the lamina, but in addition, facets in one or more segments of the spinal cord are usually sacrificed as well. Microdiscectomy is another surgical alternative which uses small incisions, and a miniature camera for viewing, to enter the spinal cord and release pressure on the nerve roots. Laminoplasty and spinal fusion surgeries are other alternative surgical procedures that can be performed. However, they are relatively new methods which still require more research and advancements in order for it to be safely performed with minimal risks.

The use of interspinous spacers is associated with increased costs and rates of reoperation, while evidence comparing effectiveness of the MILD procedure to spinal decompression is insufficient. The effectiveness of laminectomy, microdiscectomy, laminoplasty and spinal fusion surgeries as an alternative to spinal decompression has also been heavily debated, with studies showing conflicting results. While studies show that surgery improves walking ability, minimizes constant pain and improves quality of life, comparisons between the efficacy of surgical and nonsurgical treatment of  have yielded mixed results.

Prognosis 
However, most  patients that present with  often seek medical help and treatment due to the condition causing pain and affecting their quality of life. Consequently, the prognosis of untreated  and  has not been well reported and is unknown.

For  patients that develop worse symptoms over time, severe consequences can occur. Over time, untreated  and  can lead to chronic pain and muscle weakness. In severe cases, caudea equina syndrome can develop, disrupting sensory and motor function in the lower body and bladder. In most scenarios, the prognosis of  can lead to potential disability, muscle weakness or constant pain in the lower body.

Epidemiology 
 is a noncommunicable condition and thus, does not pose any community risks in terms of infectiousness. Rather, NC is associated with increasing age and mostly affects individuals over the age of 60. Age is a major contributing factor to the onset of  due to spinal degenerative changes that are brought by aging and the weakening of bones and ligaments in the lumbar area.  is also more likely present in individuals with other spinal comorbidities.

Relative to their respective age groups, 16% of individuals aged less than 40 experience  whilst 38.8% of individuals aged over 60 experience . Between the ages of 60 and 69, the prevalence of  relative to this population group is 47.2%. Among individuals with spinal stenosis,  is present in greater than 90% of patients and present in almost half of patients that present with low back pain, with over 200,000 people being affected in the United States.

Current research 

Physical Therapy 

Studies have found that physical therapies such as stretches and strengthening exercises have yielded mixed results in terms of its effectiveness in treating . Reports have shown that physical therapy does aid in treating  in patients with light to mild symptoms, whilst others have shown the contrary. It has also been found that patients with more severe symptoms of  find less long-term success in treating the condition through physical therapy. With more detailed research, doctors will then be able to suggest the best treatment options for their patients, to help them recover from the condition.

Medications 

Medications commonly prescribed to  patients are generally steroids, pain relievers or anti-inflammatories that aim to reduce pain and provide pain-relief. However, studies have found that these medications only provide temporary relief for patients, and do not provide a permanent solution, with symptoms often reoccurring several months following the disuse of medications. Hence, doctors have reported that it is important to research possible medications that can provide long term relief or a permanent solution for patients. The drug functions by selectively targeting and inhibiting Nerve Growth Factors (NGF) in the body. By blocking NGF in the body, Tanezumab aims to prevent pain signals produced in the body from reaching the brain, thus, reducing pain and providing relief for patients. Whilst positive results have been shown in several studies, further research is still necessary for its safe and effective use.

Surgical Procedures 

Whilst surgical procedures exist to treat , current methods involve partial or complete removal of the lamina and segments of the spinal cord, leading to poor stability. Hence, orthopedic surgeons and neurosurgeons have been developing and researching other surgical techniques that reduce this side effect. Haruo Tsuji, in 1990, introduced a procedure known as Laminoplastie En-block expansive Laminoplasty as an alternative to laminectomy and since then, variations and further developments have been made on that procedure, with developments still being currently. This procedure involves a reconstruction of the vertebral lamina such that it creates a hinge on one side, allowing for decreased pressure on spinal nerve roots. Advances in this procedure involve finding ways to access the spinal cord with minimal incisions and to more effectively create hinges that replicate normal functioning of the spine. In addition to Laminoplasty, spinal fusion surgeries have also been of growing interest to orthopedic surgeons and neurosurgeons. This process involves connecting two vertebrae of the bones together to reduce pain or correct any spinal deformities. However, these types of surgeries are difficult and dangerous to perform due to the sensitive nature of the spinal area. Additionally, these techniques are relatively new and thus, more research and advances in its methodology is still required for it to be considered a reliable and viable option to treat  patients.

See also 
 Lumbar spinal stenosis
 Spondylosis
 Spinal disease
 Lumbar disc disease
 Claudication
 Orthopedic surgery
 Neurosurgery

References 

Nerve, nerve root and plexus disorders